Otar Shalvovich Kushanashvili (born 22 June 1970, Kutaisi) is a Georgian and Russian music journalist and broadcaster who describes himself as "anti-publicist".
He is known for his provocative and outrageous antics.

In 2004, during a match between Russia and Portugal in the Euro 2004 soccer ran onto the field to protest the removal of the game goalkeeper Sergei Ovchinnikov. During the run to the judge he was fined €2,500 and sentenced to two years' probation.

References

External links

Official website
Блог

1970 births
Living people
People from Kutaisi
Russian television presenters
Ukrainian television presenters
Russian music journalists
Russian music critics
Journalists from Georgia (country)
Russian columnists
Russian reporters and correspondents
Russian people of Georgian descent
Streakers
Russian activists against the 2022 Russian invasion of Ukraine